Mikhail Georgiyevich Astafyev (born September 16, 1946) is a physicist and a former Russian politician. Born in Moscow, he was the Peoples' Deputy of the Russian Federation from 1990 to 1993.

References

1946 births
Defenders of the White House (1991)
Living people
Russian nationalists
Russian politicians
Soviet politicians